Dan Coughlan was an Irish hurler. His championship career at senior level with the Cork county team spanned four seasons from 1916 until 1919.

Born in Cork, Coughlan first played competitive hurling with the St Finbarr's club. During a successful period for the club, he won four county championship medals.

Coughlan made his debut with the Cork senior team during the 1916 championship and went on to become a regular member of the team at various times over the following few years. During this time he won his sole All-Ireland medal. Coughlan also won one Munster medal.

Honours
St Finbarr's
Cork Senior Hurling Championship (1): 1919, 1922, 1923, 1926 (c)

Cork
All-Ireland Senior Hurling Championship (1): 1919
Munster Senior Hurling Championship (1): 1919

References

St Finbarr's hurlers
Cork inter-county hurlers
Year of birth missing
Year of death missing